Eastburn is an unincorporated community in Iroquois County, in the U.S. state of Illinois.

History
A post office was established at Eastburn in 1891, and remained in operation until 1901. Allen M. Eastburn, the first postmaster, gave the community his name.

References

Unincorporated communities in Iroquois County, Illinois
Unincorporated communities in Illinois